Labrisz Lesbian Association was founded in 1999 in Budapest, Hungary. Its purpose is making the lives and issues of lesbian, bisexual and transgender women more visible, along with seeking to aid these women with various cultural programs and discussion groups. Labrisz Lesbian Association is also one of the co-founders of the Rainbow Mission Foundation - the Foundation mainly responsible for organizing the Budapest Pride festival each year.

The name 'Labrisz' is the Hungarian word for Labrys, the ancient double-headed axe. Although it is most commonly understood to be a weapon as well as a crop harvesting tool, some claim that it was most emphatically not a weapon. It is also commonly used as a feminist and lesbian symbol around the world, associated with female empowerment.

Activities

Budapest Pride
Labrisz is one of the co-founders of the Rainbow Mission Foundation that is responsible for organizing the Pride Festival each year in Hungary. Labris organizes female-focused programs (mostly workshops) for the festival.

Labrisz Evenings
These are monthly discussion groups for lesbian, bisexual and transgender women with the primary aim of breaking closet doors, reducing social isolation, and helping to develop self-acceptance and to build a community. Topics range from literary nights to practical questions such as love, dating, relationship issues to more theoretical ones like the representation of women in society.

LGBT History Month in Hungary
Labrisz, arm-in-arm with Háttér Support Society for LGBT People in Hungary, joined the worldwide program series for the first time in February 2013. The aim of the history month is to help in understanding the life and culture of LGBT people, and (re)discover LGBT history through artistic, cultural and public-life events.

In 2014, on the II. LGBT History Month Labrisz hosted, among various other events, a carnival party where the Association's hobby band 'Pink Csikk Para Pánik Zenekar' celebrated its 10th birthday with a show. The party also featured a woman politician costume competition.

Lesbian Identities Festival
The Association organized its first Lesbian Identities Festival (LIFT) in the fall of 2005. It was Hungary's first one-day lesbian cultural program with film screenings, workshops, literary events, a lesbian herstory exhibition (for more, see below) and a lesbian party. The festival, whose main purpose is dissolving stereotypes about lesbians and making lesbian lives more visible, is organized yearly since 2007. Since 2009 the timespan of the festival fluctuates between a week and three days.

Lesbian Herstory Archive
In 2008 the association started a lesbian herstory project, making interviews with lesbians above 45 (in which they talk about living as a lesbian before the change of regime in Hungary in 1989) in order to create the basis of an archive and an edited volume. Secret Years, a documentary based on 11 interviews, was shown in the 2009 LIFT Festival, the volume of interviews with the same title, containing 16 interviews, was published in Hungarian in 2011. The documentary film is available on DVD with subtitles in 12 languages including English, German, French, Spanish, Russian and more.

Queen of Spades Game Club
This is a monthly gathering where women can play card and board games with each other. The club is open for anyone so it is a great opportunity to see old friends and meet new people as well. Until 2014 the events were held at a gay-friendly bar in the heart of Budapest.

Book publications
The Association also published a number of books relevant to the lives of lesbians in Hungarian.

Lesbian Space
Published in 1999, this is a collection of essays about lesbian herstory, politics, feminism, identity, representation and coming out.

Counterwinds: Lesbians in Fiction
Published in 2000, this is a literary anthology containing, among a great variety of others, the translated work of many notable writers such as Jeanette Winterson, Dorothy Allison and Adrienne Rich.

Not a Taboo Anymore: A Manual for Teachers on Lesbians, Gays, Bisexuals and Transgenders
This is a handbook for teachers published in 2002 together with Háttér Support Society for LGBT People in Hungary. The handbook contains information materials, activities to handle the question of homosexuality, writings about school times, a dictionary, recommended readings and films, as well as the contact information of LGBT organizations. Its content is being reviewed and updated as part of the "Getting to Know LGBT People" educational programme, of which more information is shared below.

Developed Self-Portraits: Lesbian Women’s Autobiographical Writings
This is an autobiographical collection which includes letters, diaries and other autobiographical writings of lesbians from the early times till today, from Australia through America to Western and Eastern Europe. Featured lesbians include: Vita Sackville-West, Virginia Woolf, Gertrude Stein, Marlene Dietrich, Radclyffe Hall and more.

Secret Years
One of the results of the associations herstory project - a volume of 16 interviews with middle-aged or older lesbians who talk about their lives before the change of regime in 1989. The volume was published in 2011 in Hungarian and is currently in the process of being translated into English.

"Getting to Know LGBT People" educational programme
The main activity of this programme is having discussions with high school students and prospective teachers about LGBT people. The aim of the program is to foster an educational environment for students and teachers alike, where no one has to suffer from any form of harassment based on their gay, lesbian or bisexual orientation.

References

External links
 Labrisz Lesbian Association Official Website
 Lmbtszovetseg.hu

LGBT organisations in Hungary